Mahela Jayawardene is a retired Sri Lankan cricketer and a former captain of the Sri Lanka national cricket team. He has been described as one of the best batsmen produced by the country. Jayawardene was the leading run-scorer for Sri Lanka in Tests, after fellow Sri Lankan Kumar Sangakkara surpassed him, and Mahela has scored 35 centuries. He has scored 19 centuries in his One Day International (ODI) career, and is the fourth-highest run-scorer for Sri Lanka. On 9 November 2014, he scored his 17th ODI century against India and also became only the 5th player to score 12,000 runs in One Day Internationals, after Sachin Tendulkar, Sanath Jayasuriya, Ricky Ponting & teammate Kumar Sangakkara. He is the highest scorer for the country in Twenty20 International (T20I) matches as well, and has scored one century. Jayawardene was chosen as captain of the International Cricket Council's (ICC) World One Day International team and selected as Captain of the Year at the 2006 ICC Awards. He was recognized as one of the Wisden Cricketers of the Year in 2007, and was a member of the ICC World Test team the following year.

Jayawardene's debut Test match was against India in August 1997, in which the Sri Lankan team made a world record 952 runs for 6 wickets. He scored his maiden Test century in his fourth match, played in June 1998 against New Zealand. The 150 he scored against Bangladesh in September 2001 is the fastest Test century made by a Sri Lankan player. However, this innings came to an unusual end when he retired out just after reaching 150 runs. Jayawardene's best innings was made against South Africa in July 2006 when he scored 374 runs, surpassing Sanath Jayasuriya's record of 340 for the highest individual score by a Sri Lankan batsman. It is also the fourth-highest score in Test cricket, as well as part of the world's highest Test partnership—624 runs—which he established with teammate Kumar Sangakkara. Jayawardene has scored a total of 34 centuries during his career, the second highest number by a Sri Lankan player, after Kumar Sangakkara. He has scored more than 200 runs on seven of these occasions. This is the second-highest number of double centuries by a Sri Lankan player, behind Kumar Sangakkara. He is also one of only three players who have scored a triple century for Sri Lanka; the other two being Jayasuriya and Sangakkara.

Jayawardene made his ODI debut against Zimbabwe on 24 January 1998, and scored his first century a year later, against England on 23 January 1999. Although not as illustrious as his Test centuries, he has since made 19 ODI centuries for Sri Lanka. This is the fourth-highest number of centuries for Sri Lanka by a single player behind Jayasuriya's 28, Sangakkara's 21, and Dilshan's 20. On 10 June 2007, Jayawardene scored 107 runs for the Asia XI team, which he captained during the 2007 Afro-Asia Cup. Mahendra Singh Dhoni, who scored an unbeaten 139 in the same match, and Jayawardene are the only players who have scored a century for Asia XI. Jayawardene became the sixth player to score a century at a Cricket World Cup Final with an unbeaten 103 against India during the final match of the 2011 Cricket World Cup. However, Sri Lanka lost the match, making Jayawardene the first centurion in a lost cause at a World Cup final.

Jayawardene made his T20I debut against England on 15 June 2006, and scored his first century against Zimbabwe on 3 May 2010. Jayawardene was the fourth player to score a century in a T20I, and the first Sri Lankan to do so.

Key 
 *  Remained not out
   Captain in that match
   Man of the match
 (D/L)  Result was determined by the Duckworth–Lewis method

Test cricket centuries

ODI Centuries

T20I cricket centuries

Notes

References
General

Specific

External links
Player profile of Jayawardene at Cricinfo

Jayawardene, Mahela
Jayawardene